Achille Locatelli (15 March 1856 in Seregno, Milan, Italy – 5 April 1935 in Rome) was a Roman Catholic cardinal. He worked in papal diplomacy, and among other positions, he was nuntius in Argentina, Paraguay, and Uruguay.

He was named Apostolic Nuncio to Belgium on 8 July 1916.

He was appointed Apostolic Nuncio to Portugal on 18 July 1918.

He was made cardinal in 1922 by Pope Pius XI.

References

External links
Achille Cardinal Locatelli

1856 births
1935 deaths
People from Seregno
20th-century Italian cardinals
Pontifical Roman Seminary alumni
Pontifical Ecclesiastical Academy alumni
Apostolic Nuncios to Argentina
Apostolic Nuncios to Paraguay
Apostolic Nuncios to Uruguay
Apostolic Nuncios to Belgium
Apostolic Nuncios to Luxembourg
Apostolic Nuncios to Portugal
20th-century Italian Roman Catholic titular archbishops

Cardinals_created_by_Pope_Pius_XI